Theoclia may refer to:
 Theoclia (sister of Alexander Severus), sister of the Roman emperor Alexander Severus
 Saint Theoclia, 4th century saint and martyr